Searles High School was a public high school located in Great Barrington in the Berkshire Hills of western Massachusetts.  Students attended the school from Great Barrington, the villages of Housatonic, Van Deusenville and other communities in the southern Berkshire region. Searles High School was founded in 1898 and closed in 1968, when its students transferred to a new regional high school.

Early school history in Great Barrington
The history of education in Great Barrington can be traced to a period before the American Revolutionary War in the mid-1700s. Colonial settlers, highly valuing literacy, often supported a local schoolmaster with private donations or church sponsorship.  The town's first allocation of public funds to support education occurred in the year of its incorporation, 1761. While an early sign of its commitment to education, it would be a century before the rural pioneer community could support a public high school. Throughout the region one room school houses were opening, focused primarily on basic literacy skills. In the late 1700s and early 1800s more organized efforts emerged through private academies with more advanced teaching capacities.  Most notable was a school established by the three Kellogg sisters.  The contributions of the Kellogg, Sherwood and Hopkins families to local education are significant.  It was the inherited fortune of Mary Sherwood Hopkins Searles, niece of the Kellogg sisters, that funded the widely admired new high school building constructed in 1898.

High school history
Great Barrington's first public high school was established in 1868, occupying a temporary site until a year later when a new building was completed. In 1898 an impressive new building was dedicated for the high school.  This event proved so significant for the town that the school was named for its benefactor, and the date marks the founding of Searles High School. The school was named for Edward Francis Searles, whose deceased wife, Mary_Hopkins_Searles, was a Great Barrington native and had been the wife of Mark Hopkins, Jr., one of California's railroad barons. Early in its history Searles High School served students enrolled from throughout the southwestern corner of the state, as well as from three Connecticut towns and one town in New York.  In 1923 there were seven women and four men on the high school faculty to teach 305 students.  In June 1935 the high school had its largest graduating class to date of eighty-six students.

The increasing enrollment first led to discussions of constructing a new building for the high school, and eventually led to the regionalization discussions beginning in the late 1940s.  “The Blotter” was the first school newspaper.  In later years the newspaper became known as “The Spectator”.  The school's yearbook was “The Climbing Ivy”.  Through its seventy-year history, school records document 3,927 graduates.

Student life
The 1957 edition of The Climbing Ivy yearbook, gives an account of student life, as the school entered its last decade.

Academics
The academic curriculum included general, commercial and college preparatory courses.  There were twenty-one faculty members, with the principal and vice-principal also serving as instructors.  There were sixty-four seniors in 1957, including thirty-eight boys and twenty-six girls. English, history, civics, mathematics and science courses were either required or offered.  Latin, French and Spanish were also offered.  Additionally, art, mechanical drawing, home economics and physical education were included in the curriculum.

Extracurricular activities
Searles High School placed a strong emphasis on engaging students with an array of extracurricular activities.  There was a student council, and each grade elected four class officers.  Each spring several students were chosen to participate at the annual Boys and Girls State in Boston.  Student publications included The Climbing Ivy yearbook and Spectator literary magazine, published three times a year.

There was an Orchestra, Band, Majorettes and Dramatics Club.  Other clubs included:

 In School Glee Club
 After School Glee Club
 Airplane Club
 First Aid Club
 Camera Club 
 Radio Club
 Morse Code Club
 Cooking and Sewing Club
 Izaak Walton Club
 Stamp Club

Complementing the academic curriculum, were Science, Scholastic, Current Events Clubs.  In addition to the clubs there were Dance and Float Committees and aTraffic Squad.

Athletics
The school's small student body was able to support one sport each season for both boys and girls. In the fall, the boys played soccer and the girls played field hockey.  Both the boys and girls played basketball in the winter.   In the spring the boys fielded a baseball team, while the girls fielded a softball team.  There was a cheerleading squad that supported the boys' varsity basketball team.

Searles High School was a member of the Southern Berkshire League, but competed against teams throughout Berkshire County as well as against teams from nearby towns in New York state.  In 1957 teams played against these schools:

 Mt. Everett Regional High School, Sheffield, MA
 Williams High School, Stockbridge, MA
 Lee High School, Lee, MA
 Lenox Memorial High School, Lenox, MA
 Dalton High School, Dalton, MA
 Pittsfield High School, Pittsfield, MA
 Drury High School, North Adams, MA
 Roeliff Jansen High School, Hillsdale, NY
 Webutuck High School, Amenia, NY

Regionalization
Creating economies of scale was the rationale for the school regionalization efforts of the 1950s and 1960s. However, discussions around regionalization were complex and often contentious.  Faced with increasing costs for maintaining adequate facilities, instructional personnel and curricular resources, some small rural districts felt pressured to explore consolidation with neighboring districts.  For over a decade into the mid-1960s, Great Barrington explored consolidation with partners to the west and south, including Alford, Egremont, Mt. Washington, Sheffield and New Marlborough.  Ultimately, those towns formed the Southern Berkshire Regional School District, the first of many regional districts in the state.  Great Barrington chose not to regionalize with these partners.

Regionalization approved
Great Barrington began negotiating with new partners to the north.  In June 1965 its voters joined those in Stockbridge and West Stockbridge in approving plans for a regional high school.  The favorable vote tallies were: 922-554 in Great Barrington,  407-149 in Stockbridge and 178-55 in West Stockbridge.  They created the Berkshire Hills Regional School District, and planning began for their primary and secondary schools to be located on adjoining campuses in Great Barrington.  The district offices would be located in Stockbridge.  The regionalization agreement united long-time sports rivals Searles High School and Williams High School into one student body.

School closure
The last class to graduate from Searles High School was in June 1967.  The school did not actually close until April 1968, when the senior and junior classes moved to the newly completed Monument Mountain Regional High School in Great Barrington near the Stockbridge town line. Economies of scale for rural districts and increasing student populations led to the closure of its high school, an outcome Great Barrington had debated for over a decade.   While the new regional high school was located within the town's city limits, it was several miles to the north of the 1898 building's central location in the heart of Great Barrington's small downtown.

Principals of the high school, 1898-1967

 George R. Pinkham	1898-1903
 Wallace E. Richmond	1903-1910
 Charles A. Holbrook	1910-1911
 J. Leslie Purdom		1911-1916
 Arthur W. Ruff		1916-1918
 W. Scott Austin		1918-1924
 Roland M. Bartlett	1924-1929
 E.J. Franklin		        1929-1930
 Kenneth J. Preston	1930-1939
 Saron M. Husted		1939-1943
 Frank T. Coughlin	1943-1955
 John A. Clark		1955-1967

Notable alumni
 W.E.B. Du Bois, sociologist and civil rights activist.

1898 high school building
The new school building was dedicated January 21, 1898.  The event was so significant, that this is the date the school marks as its founding, even though the town already had established a public high school.  Designed by Boston Architect Henry Vaughan.  Known as a church architect, Vaughan collaborated with Searles on a number of projects.  The three story, Queen Anne design was considered to be grand in proportions, exceeding local expectations and receiving acclaim beyond the Berkshire region.  The building still stands today and has been the object of various reuse proposals, including that of a boutique hotel to serve the area's significant tourist trade. The new school was built adjacent to “Olympian Field”, a venue for athletic events and an earlier gift to the community from Mr. Searles.  Upon the opening of the new regional high school and the closing of Searles High School, the 1898 building began to serve as a middle school.

Remodeling controversy
The conversion of the historic 1898 Queen Anne school building into a boutique hotel provoked intense controversy in the town.  In spite of the project's approval by the town's Historic Commission, strong community sentiment favors preservation of one of the town's landmark structures. The hotel proposal involves maintaining some internal structural elements, but models depict a fully transformed contemporary facade with no trace of the admired original Queen Anne design.  A “Save the Searles School” effort has been undertaken to stop the project.

References

External links
 History of Great Barrington: (Berkshire County,) Massachusetts, Charles James Taylor, 1882
 Save Searles School 
 Hotel site review attracts belligerent crowd to Great Barrington Town Hall
 Berkshire Hills Regional School District

Great Barrington, Massachusetts
School buildings completed in 1898
Schools in Berkshire County, Massachusetts
Defunct schools in Massachusetts
Former school buildings in the United States
1968 disestablishments in Massachusetts